Weston "Wes" Edward Vivian (October 25, 1924 – December 4, 2020) was an American World War II veteran, electrical engineer and politician from the state of Michigan. He served one term in the  U.S. House of Representatives from 1965 to 1967.

Biography 
Vivian was born in Pushthrough in the Dominion of Newfoundland (now the Canadian province of Newfoundland & Labrador), and moved to the United States with his parents on September 5, 1929, settling in Cranston, Rhode Island where he attended school.  He served in the United States Navy as an enlisted man and officer from 1943 to 1946.  

He received a B.S. at Union College, Schenectady, New York, in 1945, and a M.S. at the Massachusetts Institute of Technology, Cambridge in 1949, and a Ph.D. at the University of Michigan, Ann Arbor in 1959.  He was a candidate for city council of Ann Arbor from 1958 to 1959 and a research engineer and lecturer at the University of Michigan from 1951 to 1959.  He was chairman of the Ann Arbor City Democratic Committee from 1959 to 1960.  He was electronics engineer and consultant for various firms and institutions.

Tenure in Congress 
In 1964, Vivian was elected as a Democrat from Michigan's 2nd congressional district to the 89th United States Congress, serving from January 3, 1965, to January 3, 1967.  He was known as one of the Michigan Five Fluke Freshmen and was an unsuccessful candidate for reelection in 1966 to the Ninetieth Congress, being defeated by then-state Representative Marvin L. Esch.

Later career and death 
Vivian later served as vice president of Vicom Industries, Inc. in Ann Arbor and became a lecturer at the Institute of Public Policy Studies, University of Michigan.  He also became a telecommunications consultant. He was a Unitarian and a member of the NAACP. He died in Ann Arbor, Michigan in December 2020, at the age of 96.

References

General references

The Political Graveyard
	

1924 births
2020 deaths
University of Michigan alumni
University of Michigan faculty
Politicians from Ann Arbor, Michigan
Politicians from Cranston, Rhode Island
Military personnel from Rhode Island
Canadian emigrants to the United States
Democratic Party members of the United States House of Representatives from Michigan
United States Navy personnel of World War II
United States Navy officers
Military personnel from Michigan